The 1955 NCAA basketball tournament involved 24 schools playing in single-elimination play to determine the national champion of men's  NCAA Division I college basketball. It began on March 8, 1955, and ended with the championship game on March 19 in Kansas City, Missouri. A total of 28 games were played, including a third-place game in each region and a national third-place game.

San Francisco, coached by Phil Woolpert, won the national title with a 77–63 victory in the final game over La Salle, coached by Ken Loeffler. Bill Russell of San Francisco was named the tournament's Most Outstanding Player.

Locations
The following are the sites selected to host each round of the 1955 tournament:

East-1 Region

First round (March 8)
Madison Square Garden, New York, New York

East-1 Regional (March 11 and 12)
The Palestra, Philadelphia, Pennsylvania

East-2 Region

First round (March 9)
Memorial Coliseum, Lexington, Kentucky

East-2 Regional (March 11 and 12)
McGaw Memorial Hall, Evanston, Illinois

West-1 Region

First round (March 8)
Thunderbird Coliseum, El Reno, Oklahoma

West Regional (March 11 and 12)
Ahearn Field House, Manhattan, Kansas

West-2 Region

First round (March 8)
Cow Palace, San Francisco, California

West-2 Regional (March 11 and 12)
Oregon State Coliseum, Corvallis, Oregon

Final Four

March 18 and 19
Municipal Auditorium, Kansas City, Missouri

For the third straight year, and sixth overall, the Municipal Auditorium in Kansas City, Missouri was the site of the Final Four. There were four new sites used in the 1955 tournament. For the first time since the 1939 National Championship, the tournament returned to the campus of Northwestern University, with games played at McGaw Memorial Hall, the then-three-year-old home to the Wildcats basketball program. The tournament also returned to the San Francisco area for the first time since 1939, with the first round of the West-2 regional played at the Cow Palace in Daly City, the immediate southern suburb of San Francisco. Both the Cow Palace and McGaw Memorial Hall would host Final Fours within the next five years after this. The tournament also came to the state of Kentucky for the first time, with games at the Memorial Coliseum on the campus of the University of Kentucky. The Wildcats' home court would host the tournament ten times in twenty years before being replaced by Rupp Arena. The fourth new arena was, to date, one of the smallest venues in arguably the smallest town ever to host a tournament game. The Thunderbird Coliseum, located at the Canadian County fairgrounds along U.S. Route 66 in the distant Oklahoma City suburb of El Reno, hosted the West-1 regional first-round game between Bradley and the host school, Oklahoma City University. The Chiefs would host the tournament once more in their history, in 1957 at another high school gymnasium in Oklahoma City. This was the first of three high school gymnasiums in five years to host tournament games.

Teams

Bracket

East-1 Region

East-2 Region

West-1 Region

West-2 Region

Final Four

Notes
The 1955 tournament saw a record eleven teams - Canisius, Duke, Iowa, Marquette, Memphis State, San Francisco, Southern Methodist, Tulsa, West Texas State, West Virginia and Williams College - make the tournament for the first time. This beat the record of ten teams set in 1953 (the first year which the tournament expanded to include a regional quarterfinal round), and would be beat in 1981 when 12 teams made the tournament.
Two teams in the field, West Texas State College (now known as West Texas A&M University) and Williams College of Williamstown, Massachusetts, are no longer in Division I. Neither team would make the tournament again; West Texas is now in Division II and Williams is in Division III. The NCAA would split into University and College Divisions in 1956, thus ending the chances for smaller teams such as these to make the tournament.

See also
 1955 National Invitation Tournament
 1955 NAIA Basketball Tournament

References

NCAA Division I men's basketball tournament
Ncaa
NCAA University Division basketball tournament
NCAA University Division basketball tournament